Senator Keeler may refer to:

Anson F. Keeler (1887–1943), Connecticut State Senate
Edwin O. Keeler (1846–1923), Connecticut State Senate